Dutköy can refer to:

 Dutköy, Çorum
 Dutköy, Kahta